Japan Cooperative Party (Nihon Kyōdōtō) may refer to:
Japan Cooperative Party (1945–46)
Japan Cooperative Party (1946–47)